We Can Have Peace In The Holy Land: A Plan That Will Work is a New York Times Best Seller book by Jimmy Carter, 39th President of the United States (1977–1981) and winner of the 2002 Nobel Peace Prize.  It was published by Simon & Schuster in February 2009. It came as a sequel to his 2006 book Palestine: Peace Not Apartheid believing that U.S president Barack Obama said he will make a personal effort for Middle East Peace from the beginning of his administration.

While President, Carter hosted talks between Menachem Begin of Israel and Anwar Sadat of Egypt that led to the Israel-Egypt Peace Treaty.  In this book Carter argues that Israel's continued control of Palestinian land has been the primary obstacle to a comprehensive peace agreement in the Middle East.

Table of contents
 Introduction: Storm Over a Book
 From Abraham's Journeys to the Six-Day War
 My Early Involvement with Israel
 Peace at Camp David
 Reagan, Bush I, and Clinton, 1981-2000
 The Early Bush II Years, 2001-2005
 Withdrawal from Gaza and Its Aftermath
 Spasmodic Peace Efforts, Long Overdue
 How Close Is Israel to Its Major Goals?
 A Search for Information
 Can Hamas Play a Positive Role?
 Assessment of the Region
 Challenges to Israelis and Palestinians
 An Agenda for Peace

References

Books by Jimmy Carter
Political science books
Israeli–Palestinian conflict books
Books about Palestinians
Books critical of Israel
2009 non-fiction books
American political books
Books written by presidents of the United States